Timothy F. "Tim" Ritchey (born May 27, 1951, in Pittsburgh, Pennsylvania) is an American Thoroughbred racehorse trainer. He is best known as the trainer of Afleet Alex, a 2005 winner of two American Classic Races, the Preakness and Belmont Stakes.

Tim Ritchey married Janet Wood, a native of England. The couple has two sons, Christopher and Benjamin, who were born in Lebanon, Pennsylvania.

References
 Tim Ritchey at the NTRA

1951 births
Living people
American horse trainers
Sportspeople from Pittsburgh